Isiaka Busari known predominantly as Mighty Joe was a Nigerian bandit. He was the sidekick to Ishola Oyenusi. After the death of Oyenusi, Mighty Joe took charge of the gang, terrorising the mostly the south western part of Nigeria. He was executed by firing squad in 1973.

Early life 
Mighty Joe was born in 1936 in Lagos, Lagos State into a family of seven. Due to financial constraints, Mighty Joe became a dropout from primary school. He later joined a street boxing group against the will of his parents. Due to lack of employment, Mighty Joe joined a street gang and became a political thug. He joined Dr. Ishola in armed robbery operations. After the death of Dr. Ishola, he took charge of the gang; recruiting ex-military to aid him carry out his operations. Before he was shot, he converted to a Islam.

Death 
Mighty Joe was arrested on 1973 while trying to snatch ₦10 from a bar attendant called Michael Osayunana. After trials, on 6 June 1973, a convoy drove him from Kirikiri Maximum Security Prison to Lagos Bar Beach where he was executed.

Controversy 
His death raised a controversy as some people thought that his execution was a set-up aided by Daily Times because of fuss between Mighty Joe and the owners of the newspaper.

References 

People executed for murder
Bank robbers
Nigerian gangsters
Nigerian people convicted of murder
People convicted of murder by Nigeria
20th-century executions by Nigeria
Executed Nigerian people
1973 murders in Africa